Princess Maud may refer to:

People
 Maud of Wales, later Queen Maud of Norway, daughter of Edward VII of the United Kingdom
 Maud Carnegie, Countess of Southesk, granddaughter of Edward VII of the United Kingdom; known as "Her Highness Princess Maud" from 1905 to 1923

Ships

See also
Queen Maud (disambiguation)
Maud (disambiguation)